This is a list of J.League designated special players, picked by J.League clubs from universities and high schools all over Japan.

System information
The system, in place since 1998, aims to provide high potential players "a suitable environment in accordance with the player's ability." Most young players are registered with their university or high school until they are at least 18 and as such cannot be registered with another team. The 'designated special players' system allows J.League clubs to invite a maximum of three players to train and play in J.League competitions, without changing their registration status from their current registered team. Therefore, during this time, the player is allowed to play for both their educational institution and their J.League club. This provides the players an opportunity to train and play at a higher level, whilst also giving the clubs an opporutinity to sell themselves as a potential destination upon completion of their studies. Although most of the time players go on to sign a professional contract with their host club, there is no guarantees or assurances that it will always be the case.

A player is eligible to become a designated special players if they fulfill the following requirements:
 They have an official offer from a J. League club
 They have Japanese citizenship or do not apply as a foreign player
 They registered with teams under the Japan University Football Association, the All Japan High School Athletic Federation, or teams of the Japan Club Youth Federation Level 2 other than J.League club teams.

Once approved, the players can then participate in any of the following competitions:
 J1, J2, J3 League matches
 League Cup matches
 Pre-season matches
 J.League promotion/relegation play-off matches
 Other official matches organised by J.League and the Japan FA

Key

Designated special players

1998

1999

2000

2001

2002

2003

2004

2005

2006

2007

2008

2009

2010

2011

2012

2013

2014

2015

2016

2017

2018

2019

2020

2021

2022

2023

Records
As of 15 February 2023

 Educational institution with most designated special players:
 Fukuoka University (35)
 J.League club taken on most designated special players:
 FC Tokyo (35)

Caps
All records below are for while the player was specially designated
 Most J1 caps: 15
 Tomoya Fujii (Sanfrecce Hiroshima, 2020)
 Most J2 caps: 21
 Yusuke Matsuo (Yokohama FC, 2019)
 Most J3 caps: 16
 Takuya Koyama (FC Tokyo U-23, 2016)
 Most League Cup caps: 8
 Takuro Kaneko (Hokkaido Consadole Sapporo, 2019)

Goals 
 Most J1 goals: 4
 Riki Matsuda (Oita Trinita, 2013)
 Ayase Ueda (Kashima Antlers, 2019)
 Most J2 goals: 6
 Yusuke Matsuo (Yokohama FC, 2019)
 Most J3 goals: 3
 Daisuke Kitahara (YSCC Yokohama, 2016)

References

External links
JFA Youth Development at jfa.jp 

Designated special players
J.League
Association football player non-biographical articles